Athrypsiastis delicata is a moth in the family Xyloryctidae. It was described by Alexey Diakonoff in 1954. It is found in New Guinea.

References

Athrypsiastis
Moths described in 1954
Moths of New Guinea